The 2021–22 season is Sheffield United's first season back in the Championship since the 2018–19 season following relegation last season and will be the 133rd year in their history. This season, the club will participate in the Championship, FA Cup and EFL Cup. The season covers the period from 1 July 2021 to 30 June 2022.

During pre-season, Slaviša Jokanović was appointed as manager on a three-year deal, however was sacked on 25 November 2021 after a poor start to the season. Paul Heckingbottom was appointed, and took the team from lower mid table into the playoffs by May. The season was ended in heartbreak, however, after Morgan Gibbs-White missed the deciding penalty in a shootout defeat to Nottingham Forest.

Squad statistics

Appearances and goals
Updated 9 April 2022

|-
! colspan=14 style=background:#DCDCDC; text-align:center| Goalkeepers   
                                             

|-
! colspan=14 style=background:#DCDCDC; text-align:center| Defenders

                                           

  

               
|-
! colspan=14 style=background:#DCDCDC; text-align:center| Midfielders

 
|-
! colspan=14 style=background:#DCDCDC;                                 text-align:center| Forwards

 

                                    
|-
!colspan=14|Player(s) out on loan:

|-
!colspan=14|Players who left the club:

 

|}

Goals

Transfers

Transfers in

Loans in

Loans out

Transfers out

Pre-season friendlies
The Blades confirmed they would play pre-season friendlies against Europa Point Doncaster Rovers and Norwich City as part of their preparations for the new campaign.

Competitions

Overview

Championship

League table

Results summary

Results by matchday

Matches
Sheffield United's fixtures were announced on 24 June 2021.

Play-offs

FA Cup

Sheff Utd were drawn away to Wolverhampton Wanderers in the third round.

EFL Cup

Blades were drawn at home to Carlisle United in the first round Derby County in the second round and Southampton in the third round.

References

Sheffield United
Sheffield United F.C. seasons